Antoine Bellier (born 18 October 1996) is a Swiss tennis player. He has a career high ATP singles ranking of world No. 173, achieved on 6 March 2023. He also has a career-high ATP doubles ranking of world No. 355 achieved on 3 October 2022. Bellier has won one ATP Challenger and four ITF singles titles as well as twelve doubles titles on the ITF Men's Circuit. Bellier has represented Switzerland in Davis Cup, where he has a win–loss record of 1–4.

Career

2016: ATP debut
Bellier made his ATP main draw debut at the 2016 Swiss Open Gstaad, receiving singles and doubles main draw wildcards.

2022: First ATP semifinal & Top 200 debut
Ranked No. 303 at the 2022 Mallorca Championships Bellier recorded his second ATP win over Federico Delbonis as a qualifier. He went one step further to defeat 4th seed Pablo Carreno Busta and reach his first ATP quarterfinal. He defeated Tallon Griekspoor to reach his first ATP semifinal in his career. He became the lowest ranked semi-finalist since No. 335 Juan Manuel Cerundolo in 2021 in Cordoba. As a result, he moved almost 90 positions up to World No. 217 in the rankings on 27 June 2022. He made his debut in the top 200 in the rankings on 25 July 2022 after a second round showing at the Pozoblanco Challenger where he defeated top seed Nuno Borges.

Singles performance timeline

Current through the 2023 Australian Open.

ATP Challenger and ITF Futures finals

Singles: 8 (5–3)

Doubles: 28 (13–15)

References

External links

1996 births
Living people
Swiss male tennis players
Tennis players from Geneva
21st-century Swiss people